Hwang Chul-soon is a South Korean former boxer who competed as a bantam-weight (54-kg class) in the 1976 Summer Olympics. Hwang lost his fourth fight, the quarter-final match, to eventual silver-medalist Charles Mooney.

Amateur career 
Hwang first garnered attention at the 1974 Asian Games where he won the silver medal in flyweight by losing to future Olympic champion Gu Yong-ju of North Korea in the final.

At the 1976 Summer Olympics in Montreal, Hwang pulled off a major upset in bantamweight when he beat reigning Olympic champion Orlando Martínez of Cuba in Round of 16. He, however, lost to eventual silver medalist Charles Mooney of United States by unanimous decision in the quarterfinal match.

In 1979 Hwang won the silver medal in bantamweight at the inaugural Boxing World Cup in New York City after losing to 1978 Golden Gloves winner Jackie Beard in the final.

Results

Pro career
Hwang earned a spot on the 1980 South Korean Olympic team. However, as South Korea boycotted the 1980 Summer Olympics in Moscow due to political reasons, Hwang and the rest of his team were not allowed an Olympic berth.

Hwang subsequently turned pro in early 1980 and had limited success. He retired in 1982 having won 5 with 1 KO.

References

Living people
Bantamweight boxers
Olympic boxers of South Korea
Boxers at the 1976 Summer Olympics
Asian Games medalists in boxing
Boxers at the 1974 Asian Games
Boxers at the 1978 Asian Games
South Korean male boxers
Asian Games gold medalists for South Korea
Asian Games silver medalists for South Korea
Medalists at the 1974 Asian Games
Medalists at the 1978 Asian Games
1983 births